The genus Pogonota are small to medium sized predatory flies.

Species
P. barbata (Zetterstedt, 1838)
P. gilvipes (Loew, 1863)
P. immunda (Zetterstedt, 1838)
P. nigricans (Loew, 1873)
P. pallida Malloch, 1931
P. sahlbergi (Becker, 1900)

References

Scathophagidae
Schizophora genera
Taxa named by Johan Wilhelm Zetterstedt